Eglin steel (ES-1) is a high-strength, high-performance, low-alloy, low-cost steel, developed for a new generation of bunker buster type bombs, e.g. the Massive Ordnance Penetrator and the improved version of the GBU-28 bomb known as EGBU-28. It was developed in collaboration between the US Air Force and the Ellwood National Forge Company.

The development of Eglin steel was commissioned to find a low-cost replacement for strong and tough but expensive superalloy steels such as AF-1410, Aermet-100, HY-180, and HP9-4-20/30. A high-performance casing material is required so the weapon survives the high impact speeds required for deep penetration. The material has a wide range of other applications, from missile parts and tank bodies to machine parts.

The material can be less expensive because it can be ladle-refined. It does not require vacuum processing. Unlike some other high-performance alloys, Eglin steel can be welded easily, broadening the range of its application. Also, it uses roughly half as much nickel as other superalloys, substituting silicon to help with toughness and particles of vanadium carbide and tungsten carbide for additional hardness and high-temperature strength. The material also involves chromium, tungsten, and low to medium amounts of carbon, which contribute to the material's strength and hardness.

Properties
At room temperature, ES-1's yield (tensile strength before deformation) is 193,900 psi (1,337 MPa), ultimate strength (breaking point) is 246,700 psi (1,701 MPa). At 900°F (482°C), yield is 191,400 psi (1,320 MPa), and ultimate strength is 215,700 psi (1,487 MPa). Rockwell C hardness is 45.6 (448 HV10). For toughness, the Charpy notch impact is 56.2 foot-pounds (76 J) at room temperature, and 42.7 ft-lbs (58 J) at -40F (-40°C).

ES-1 is a balance of cost, tensile strength, high temperature tensile strength and toughness. By varying the heat treatment to include water or liquid nitrogen quenching, or omitting the normalization heat-treat to permit work hardening, properties can be improved.
ES-5, with an economical air and water quench, provides 244,800 psi (1,688 MPa) of high-rate yield strength, and 291,900 psi (2,013 MPa) high-rate ultimate strength. Low-rate yield strength is 216,000 psi (1,489 MPa), and low-rate ultimate strength is 270,200 psi (1,863 MPa).

By comparison, ordinary structural steel has a yield strength of 36,000 psi, 4150 "ordnance" steel (used in high-quality military gun barrels) has a yield strength of 75,000 psi.

Details
The material composition by weight is:
 Iron (84.463–90%)
 Carbon (0.16–0.35%)
 Manganese (0.85%)
 Silicon (max. 1.25%), stabilizes the austenite phase, enhances toughness
 Chromium (max. 1.50–3.25%), enhances strength and hardenability
 Molybdenum (max. 0.55%), enhances hardenability
 Nickel (5.00%), increases toughness
 Tungsten (0.70–3.25%), enhances strength and wear resistance
 Vanadium (0.05–0.3%), increases toughness
 Copper (0.50%)
 Phosphorus (impurity, max. 0.015%)
 Sulfur (impurity, max. 0.012%)
 Calcium (max. 0.02%), sulfur control agent
 Nitrogen (impurity, max. 0.14%)
 Aluminium (max. 0.05%)

The material has an unusually wide range of production methods for a superalloy: electric arc, ladle refined with vacuum treatment; vacuum induction melting; vacuum arc remelting, and even electro slag remelting.  Vacuum treatments are recommended for best strength and premium uses.

The material has to undergo heat treatment involving normalization, quenching and tempering to develop the required austenitic microstructure, with subsequent tempering. Test plates were 1 inch.  First they were normalized.  They were charged in a furnace at 500F.  Heated at 125F per hour to 1625–1725F.  Held at 1750F for an hour per inch of section size, and then air-cooled to room temperature.  Next the samples were austenized by repeating the process up to 1700F, and held for an hour per inch of section size, then oil quenched to below 125F.  Finally, they were tempered by in an oven that started below 500F, increased at 100F per hour per inch of section size, and allowed to air-cool to room temperature.

Credit
The patent credits Morris Dilmore and James Ruhlman as inventors.

See also
 USAF-96 A later material developed for the same purposes, also at Eglin.
 Aermet (High performance steels.)
 Maraging steel (High performance precipitation-hardened steels, somewhat similar to Eglin steel.)
 Eglin Air Force Base

References

External links
 AFRL Horizons - Eglin steel
 Globalsecurity.org - EGBU-28
 Ellwood National Forge Company

Steels